was a Japanese judoka who was the Chief Instructor at the Kodokan and a manager of the Japanese national team. 

Before his death, he was one of only three living Kodokan 10th dan (and one of only 15 to have attained this rank), having been promoted at the New Year Kagami biraki Ceremony, 8 January 2006, along with Ichiro Abe and Yoshimi Osawa.

Biography

Daigo was born in January 1926 and educated at Tokyo University of Education.

He was All-Japan Judo Champion in 1951 and 1954, and the author of Kodokan Judo: Throwing Techniques, a definitive text on judo throws.

Daigo died on 10 October 2021, at the age of 95.

Bibliography
(2005) Kodokan Judo: Throwing Techniques, Kodansha, Tokyo, Japan.

References

1926 births
2021 deaths
Japanese male judoka
Kodokan 10th dans
Sportspeople from Chiba Prefecture